AVROTROS is a Dutch radio and television broadcaster that is part of the Dutch public broadcasting system. It was founded in 2014 as the result of a merger between the Algemene Vereniging Radio Omroep (AVRO) and the Televisie Radio Omroep Stichting (TROS). The name AVROTROS has been used for jointly produced programmes since 1 January 2014. Since 7 September 2014, all existing AVRO and TROS programmes have also been broadcast under the name AVROTROS.

Building 

Prior to 2014, the AVRO was housed in the  building in Hilversum from 2000, while the TROS operated from the former Christelijk Lyceum, also in Hilversum, from 1970. On 20 June 2012, it was announced that both broadcasters would move into the Wereldomroepgebouw after the merger. The move was completed after a renovation on 1 January 2014.

In 2014, AVROTROS started using the Vondelparkpaviljoen in Amsterdam, which had been renovated and renamed "Vondel CS". It was opened to the public on 13 May 2014. The building houses a number of radio and television studios, and offers space for events and activities organised for members.

Programmes 

 Beste Zangers
 Bloedverwanten
 Brugklas
 Buitenhof
 Draadstaal
 EenVandaag
 Flikken Maastricht
 Forever
 Fort Boyard
 Junior Songfestival
 Kids Top 20
 Koefnoen
 De Luizenmoeder
 Eurovision Song Contest
 Wie is de Mol?

Eurovision 
Following the Netherlands' victory at the Eurovision Song Contest 2019 with the song "Arcade" by Duncan Laurence, AVROTROS (together with NPO and NOS) would have been the host broadcaster of the Eurovision Song Contest 2020. However, this edition of the contest was later cancelled due to the COVID-19 pandemic, and as such, the three broadcasters instead hosted and produced the Eurovision Song Contest 2021.

Presenters 

 Bart Arens
 Naomi van As
 Jojanneke van den Berge
 Daniël Dekker
 Tim Douwsma
 Pieter Jan Hagens
 Antoinette Hertsenberg
 Jort Kelder
 Cornald Maas
 Roos Moggré
 Ivo Niehe
 Annemieke Schollaardt
 Jan Smit
 Monique Smit
 Rob Stenders
 Dionne Stax
 Lauren Verster
 Rik van de Westelaken

References

External links

 

Dutch public broadcasting organisations
Television channels and stations established in 2014
Radio stations established in 2014
Dutch companies established in 2014